This article shows the rosters of all participating teams at the 1998 FIVB Volleyball Men's World Championship in Japan.

Coach: Bebeto de Freitas

Coach: Guennadi Chipouline

Coach: Douglas Beal

Coach: Jin Jun-Taik

Coach: Mazur Ireneusz

Coach: Mohand Said Kaci

Coach: Zoran Gajic

Coach: Toon Gerbrands

Coach: Leonid Likhno

Coach: Stellios Kazazis

Coach: Stelio de Recco

Coach: Miroslav Nekola

Coach: Juan Diaz Marino

Coach: Gueorgui Vasilev

Coach: Daniel Castellani

Coach: Jiawei Wang

Coach: Ibrahim Fakhreldin

Coach: Fumihiko Matsumoto

Coach: Radames Lattari Filho

Coach: Vincenzo Di Pinto

Coach: Garth Pischke

Coach: Futoshi Teramawari

Coach: Gilberto Herrera

Coach: Kun Xing Wu

References

External links
Results and teams

S
FIVB Volleyball Men's World Championship squads